Sons of the Sea may refer to:

"Sons of the Sea" (Dad's Army), a 1969 episode of the British comedy series Dad's Army
Sons of the Sea (1926 film), a silent film
Sons of the Sea (1939 film), a British spy film
Atlantic Ferry, a 1941 film with the alternate title Sons of the Sea
"Sons of the Sea" (song), an 1897 English music hall song
Sons of the Sea (album), an album by the American alternative rock band Sons of the Sea